The Roman road in Cilicia is a part of a Roman road in Mersin Province, Turkey.

Geography 

The road is thought to be a part of the main road connecting Cilicia to Capadocia during antiquity. The northern terminus was likely in the town of Bahçeli, a part of the ancient city of Tyanna in Niğde Province. The southern terminus was in Tarsus, a major district center in Mersin Province and an important ancient city. But presently only a small section of the road has been unearthed. At the southern end of the unearthed section, where Tarsus is in the view, there is a gate which was either an arch gate or a border check point of Cilicia. There is also a very short road in Tarsus urban fabric called Ancient road which has been discovered only recently. But whether the two roads are connected is unclear.

History 

The road is thought to have been constructed in the 1st century AD by the Roman Empire. But according to a restoration inscription next to the road, it was rebuilt or repaired during the reign of Caracalla in the 3rd century. The original gate, dated to 5th century, was destroyed at some point, and the present gate was reconstructed much later.

Technical details 

The road is stone pavement and there are stone parapets on each side of the road.

The outer dimensions of the cut stone gate is 8.8 m. wide x 5.2 m. high ( 28.98 ft high x 17 ft wide).

References

Archaeological sites in Mersin Province, Turkey
Roman roads in Turkey
Historic roads in Turkey